Baykalovo is a rural locality (a selo) and the administrative center of Baykalovsky District, Sverdlovsk Oblast, Russia. Population:

References

Notes

Sources

Rural localities in Sverdlovsk Oblast
Irbitsky Uyezd